The Parliamentary Under-Secretary of State for Africa is a junior position in the Foreign, Commonwealth and Development Office in the British government. The office was merged with the Minister of State for Development.

Responsibilities 
The minister is responsible for the following:

 Africa (including North Africa)
 consular policy
 Parliament
 devolution
 communications
 Wilton Park and British Council
 departmental operations
 legal

List 

* Incumbent's length of term last updated: .

See also 
Foreign and Commonwealth Office
Secretary of State for Foreign and Commonwealth Affairs
Minister of State for Europe
Minister of State for Foreign Affairs
Minister of State for Middle East and North Africa
Under-Secretary of State for Foreign Affairs

References 

Foreign, Commonwealth and Development Office
Lists of government ministers of the United Kingdom
Foreign ministers of the United Kingdom